Oswaldo Calero (24 April 1945 – 23 March 1997) was a Colombian footballer. He played in eleven matches for the Colombia national football team from 1975 to 1977. He was also part of Colombia's squad for the 1975 Copa América tournament.

References

External links
 

1945 births
1997 deaths
Colombian footballers
Colombia international footballers
Place of birth missing
Association football midfielders
Deportivo Cali footballers